The Gang That Couldn't Shoot Straight is a 1971 American crime comedy film directed by James Goldstone and written by Waldo Salt, based on the 1969 novel of the same title by Jimmy Breslin, which in turn was based on the life of gangster Joe Gallo. The film stars Jerry Orbach, Leigh Taylor-Young, Jo Van Fleet, Lionel Stander, Robert De Niro and Irving Selbst. The film was released on December 22, 1971, by Metro-Goldwyn-Mayer.

Plot
Kid Sally Palumbo (Jerry Orbach) grows jealous of his older, mobster boss Baccala (Lionel Stander), who has little respect for the crew Palumbo commands. Baccala allows Kid Sally to supervise a six-day bicycle race (for the purposes of keeping the money generated), and among the 12 Italian cyclists brought into the city is Mario Trantino (Robert De Niro), a budding thief. When the bicycle race does not take place due to outside interference, Sally is demoted to serving Baccala as a chauffeur, and Trantino stays in New York City to run his own cons, including masquerading as a priest. Kid Sally's mother Big Momma (Jo Van Fleet) urges him to take down the old, entrenched mobsters in power, but it appears the only fatalities are in his own camp, and the increase in violence draws the attention of the city police.

Cast

 Jerry Orbach as Salvatore 'Kid Sally' Palumbo
 Leigh Taylor-Young as Angela Palumbo
 Jo Van Fleet as Big Momma Palumbo
 Lionel Stander as Baccala
 Robert De Niro as Mario Trantino
 Irving Selbst as 'Big Jelly' Catalano
 Hervé Villechaize as Beppo 'The Dwarf'
 Joe Santos as Ezmo
 Carmine Caridi as Tony 'The Indian'
 Frank Campanella as Water Buffalo
 Harry Basch as Joseph DeLauria
 Sander Vanocur as Television Commentator
 Phil Bruns as Gallagher
 Philip Sterling as District Attorney Goodman
 Jack Kehoe as Bartender
 Despo Diamantidou as Mourner 
 Sam Coppola as Julie DiBiasi
 James Sloyan as Joey 
 Paul Benedict as 'Shots' O'Toole
 Lou Criscuolo as Junior
 George Loros as Jerry
 Harry Davis as Dominic Laviano
 Burt Young as Willie Quarequio
 Jackie Vernon as Herman
 Ted Beniades as A Black Suit
 Fat Thomas as A Black Suit
 Roy Shuman as The Mayor
 Alice Hirson as The Mayor's Wife
 Michael V. Gazzo as A Black Suit 
 Robert Gerringer as Commissioner McGrady
 Walter Flanagan as The Super
 Dan Morgan as Muldoon
 Dorothi Fox as Meter Maid
 Robert Weil as Circus Supply Manager
 Margo Winkler as Airline Clerk 
 Leopold Badia as Old Waiter
 Fran Stevens as Baccala's Wife
 Florence Tarlow as Police Matron
 Rita Karin as Mrs. Goldfarb
 Tom Lacy as Religious Salesman
 William H. Boesen as Jury Foreman
 Gary Melkonian as Greek Racer
 Gustave Johnson as Detective Jenkins
 George Stefans as Greek Captain
 Alisha Fontaine as Jelly's Girl
 Lorrie Davis as Jelly's Other Girl
 Frank Jourdano as TV Reporter
 Elsa Raven as Mrs. Buffalo
 Gloria LeRoy as Ida

Production
According to Irwin Winkler, Francis Ford Coppola asked to write and direct the movie but Winkler turned him down, feeling Coppola did not have the skills to make a mafia film. Al Pacino was originally cast in the lead but during rehearsal pulled out to play the role of Michael Corleone in The Godfather.  He was replaced by Robert De Niro.

Shot on location in South Brooklyn, the film was the subject of a Robin Green-written November 25, 1971 Rolling Stone article "Shooting the Gang That Couldn’t" which was described in its subtitle as "a behind-the-scenes look at the filming of a Robert DeNiro [sic] movie."

Hervé Villechaize made his feature film debut, but his lines were dubbed to conceal his French accent as he was playing an Italian-American character.

Winkler wrote in his memoirs that he felt the director was more interested in sticking to the schedule than working with the actors. He felt the final film was neither funny nor dramatic.

Reception
The movie received negative reviews. Roger Ebert gave it 2/4 stars, writing: "Maybe part of the trouble is James Goldstone's direction, which tends toward the heavy-handed" and "The performances are too broad, the characters are too many, the plot is too indifferent to the structure of the movie, and - surprisingly - the movie is too sweet." New York Times'' reviewer Howard Thompson called the film "a tasteless mess" and Jo Van Fleet's performance "terrible." His only praise was for the interaction between Leigh Taylor-Young and Robert De Niro.

Home media
The movie has been released on VHS and DVD.

In Pop Culture
Arizona State House Speaker Russell Bowers referred to the book during the January 6 Select Committee hearings, when asked his thoughts on the Trump Campaign’s fake electors scheme.

See also
 List of American films of 1971

References

External links
 
 

1971 films
1970s crime comedy films
American crime comedy films
1970s English-language films
Films scored by Dave Grusin
Films about the American Mafia
Films based on American novels
Films based on organized crime novels
Films directed by James Goldstone
Films produced by Robert Chartoff
Films produced by Irwin Winkler
Films set in New York City
Mafia comedy films
Metro-Goldwyn-Mayer films
1971 comedy films
1970s American films